Pseudorthodes irrorata is a species of cutworm or dart moth in the family Noctuidae. It is found in North America.

The MONA or Hodges number for Pseudorthodes irrorata is 10582.

References

Further reading

External links

 

Eriopygini
Articles created by Qbugbot
Moths described in 1888